Richard Newland Dixon (25 December 1930—25 May 2021) FRS was a British chemist noted for his work in the field of thermal or optical properties of matter.

He was born in Borough Green, Kent the son of Robert T and Lilian Dixon He was educated at The Judd School, King's College London (BSc, 1951) and at St Catharine's College, Cambridge (PhD, 1955). He married Alison Birks in 1954.

From 1969, his career was based at the University of Bristol, starting as Chair of Theoretical Chemistry. He was elected Fellow of the Royal Society in 1986 and awarded the Rumford Medal in 2004.

References

1930 births
2021 deaths
People educated at The Judd School
Alumni of King's College London
Alumni of St Catharine's College, Cambridge
Fellows of the Royal Society
Academics of the University of Sheffield
Academics of the University of Bristol
British chemists